Minnora is an unincorporated community in Calhoun County, West Virginia, United States.

The community was named after Minnora Knotts, the daughter of a local resident.

References

Unincorporated communities in Calhoun County, West Virginia
Unincorporated communities in West Virginia